Jean-Philippe Rio-Py, (born 1983) known professionally as Riopy, is a French-born British pianist and composer. Self-taught since a very young age, he has performed in many international prestigious halls, and written several albums classified as contemporary classical music. His compositions have been featured in commercials, movie trailers, and feature films.

In January 2022, Riopy's album Tree of Light reached No. 1 on the US Billboard Classical Album chart after a continued 70 weeks in the top 10.

Early life and career
Born and raised in France, Riopy is a self-taught pianist who grew up in a secular cult with his family. Riopy began to teach himself the piano at an early age when he discovered an abandoned instrument. Without access to printed scores, he began to compose music in his head. His unique, rhythmically driven approach to performing his own compositions soon brought him to the attention of the piano firm Steinway & Sons who chose him to be a featured artist when he was 17 years old. A year later, he left his home and started playing piano in the streets.

Riopy arrived in London at 21 years old, where he worked at a small instruments shop for a few months. There, he soon met Michael Freeman, who recognized his potential and offered him a course at Oxford Brookes University. In 2006, he was then discovered at Oxford where he began his training before embarking on his professional career in London. In 2007, he gave one of his first concerts at Jacqueline Du Pré Building and the Holywell Music Room in Oxford.

In 2010, he performed at the Royal Opera House and opened the first night re-launch for the renowned The Arts Club in Mayfair in 2011. The same year, he performed at a Gala dinner in London organized by Vanity Fair, where Gwyneth Paltrow and her husband at the time, Chris Martin, were also present. The singer thanked him for his performance and three weeks later, offered him his first personal piano, a Steinway & Sons. Later in 2018, he recorded his first album Riopy on the same piano.

Music career

Career in advertising 
Since his debut, Riopy has composed music for labels such as Air-Edel, EMI and Warner/Chappell Music, while some of his works have been broadcast worldwide, and featured in advertising campaigns by Hulu, Bentley, Samsung, Mercedes, Giorgio Armani amongst others. In 2016, he composed the music for IKEA’s award winning ad. The award music supervisor behind the Swedish IKEA commercial would later state: "'Every Other Week' have become a bit of a commercial classic referred to as one of the best commercials made in recent years which RIOPY was a part of." In 2018, he wrote the longest partition for Peugeot 508 ad broadcast in France, where he is driving himself the car while writing the score on screen. Following the campaign’s large success, Warner Music decided to launch the original track “Le Rêve d’une Note” in partnership with Peugeot for people to purchase online.

Performances 
During his career, Riopy has performed in some of the most prestigious worldwide venues, including the Royal Opera House (London, UK), Steinway Hall, inside St Pancras Clock (London, UK), Salle Pleyel (Paris, France) where he played the first part of Luz Casal in 2017, The Arts Club (London, UK), underground venue of Chateau Marmont (Los Angeles, USA), Théâtre des Champs-Elysées (Paris, France), and Villa Reale (Milan, Italy). He also performed at the City Hall Stockholm (Stockholm, Sweden), famous for its grand ceremonial halls and unique pieces of art and venue of the Nobel Prize banquet held on 10 December every year.

Riopy also performed several times in concert halls in China, where his name has become popular in the last ten years.

Featured movies and trailers 
More recently, he has worked on movie trailers for Mr Turner, Jimmy's Hall, The Sense of an Ending, A Royal Night Out, Long Walk Home. He also composed the trailer for Oscar-winning films such as The Danish Girl (film) and The Shape Of Water.

His piano works have been included in documentaries broadcast on the BBC, ITV and Channel 4 as well. He notably composed the original soundtracks for On The Bridge and She Wants Soul. He was invited by Richard Branson to take part to his documentary The Kodiak Queen released in 2018 for the preservation of the seabed and the British Virgin Islands.

Solo albums 
In 2017, Riopy signed to Warner Classics with which he has been working ever since. One year later, he released his first Album, “RIOPY”. “I Love You” and “Drive” were among the most popular tracks of his album, including in China.

Riopy's first album was followed in 2019 by a second one, The Tree of Light. Seen as a force for positive change in the world by its composer, he comments: "It is a call to humanity to fight – not the wars outside, but to fight the wars inside us. A wake up call. If we are all kind to each other, and kind and compassionate and nice to ourselves and each other, we will have a better chance to save ourselves and the planet." The album was the fifth best-selling New Age Album of 2021 in the US as well as the third best-selling classical album of 2022 in the US.

During the pandemic, he writes his third album released in late 2021, Bliss, a work of eleven tracks.

Meditation work 
In the last years, Riopy has developed a keen interest in meditation and ways to improve the mental health. After going through deep anxiety and depression, he found a new passion for neurosciences, or more specifically how brainwaves work to improve one's wellbeing. In this regard, he tuned his piano on 432 Hertz on several of his fans’ suggestion, a frequency believed to help the brainwaves to relax.

In this context, Riopy composed MED66, a work of 22 minutes using binaural beats to help the listener get into meditation. He also composed a single album, Meditation 432.

Work rankings 
Riopy become one of the most prominent figures of contemporary classical music, also nowadays commonly referred to as "neo-classical music". The Billboard 2021 year-end charts ranked Riopy's Tree of Light number eight on the Classical Albums chart and fifth on the New Age Albums chart, while the album peaked at number one on the Classical Albums chart in January 2022. He now has accumulated nearly 300 million streams on digital platforms, including 15 million alone for "I Love You", from his solo bow.

Discography 
Albums
 Riopy (2018)
 The Tree of Light (2019)
 Bliss (2021)

References 

21st-century French male pianists
French composers
1983 births
Living people